Ranma may refer to:

 Ranma ½, a Japanese manga series
 Ranma Saotome, the title character in the Ranma ½ media franchise
 Ranma (architectural), a type of transom found in traditional Japanese architecture

See also
 Ramna Thana, a location in Bangladesh
 Ranna (disambiguation)